Pathankot district, is the northernmost district of the Indian state of Punjab. Pathankot city is the district headquarters. The district was created on 27 July 2011.

Etymology
The original name of Pathankot was Paithan during the Mughal times, which is in turn believed to be a derivative of Sanskrit Pratisthana.The suffix 'kot' stands for fort.

Geography

It is located in the foothills of the Sivalik Hills. It shares international borders with the Narowal District of Pakistani Punjab. It also shares borders with the Kathua District of Jammu and Kashmir and Chamba and Kangra districts of Himachal Pradesh. Hoshiarpur district shares a boundary with Pathankot in Eastern Punjab. The two main rivers – Beas and Ravi, pass through the district.

History
In the Vedic period monarchy was the form of government but from the Mahabharata period onwards we find traces of republic form of government in our country - according to Mahabharata the present Himachal Pradesh was divided into a number of small tribal republics. Panini (5th century B.C.) in his Ashtadhyayi mentioned some of the republics settled there. The Janpadas mentioned in the Mahabharata and also known to Panini are the Trigarthas, the Kulutas and Kulindas. In Shanti Parva and Sabha Parva of the Mahabharata the name of the Audambra is found mentioned at the end of the list of republic Janpadas. It is stated that the rajas of Audumbra accompanied the rajas of Kashmir, Darda and Trigarta to pay Nazaranas to the Pandava king Yudhisthira. The reference of the Audumbras is also found in Vishnu Puran, Vayu Puran, Brihat Samhita, Satapatha Brahmana and Ganpatha etc.

The state of Audumbra was lying in between the two rivers Parshini/Aravati and Vipasa, now known as Ravi and Beas, comprising entirety of Nurpur Tehsil, Tehsil of Pathankot and a large tract of plains of district Gurdaspur with its capital at Pratishthan that is present Pathankot. Most likely one of the oldest sites in the Punjab, Pratishthan (present Pathankot) was advantageously situated on the great commerce route of ancient times, which ran from Pataliputra (Patna) of Magadha state to Takshashila and further to the central Asia under the foothills. During the invasion of Alexander in 326 BCE. the state of Audambra was ruled by the Katha Kshatriyas, who had a reputation as skilled warriors. After crossing the river Ravi, Alexander entered the territory of Audumbra State and invested Sangala a stronghold of Kathas of whom Greek called Kathains or Kathoi. The Kathas fought with great dash and stubbornness so much so that even Pores had to come to the help of 'Alexander with his army of Elephants and 5000 soldiers and titled the scale of victory in his favour. 17,000 Kathas were killed and more than 70,000 were captured. This resolute resistance of the Kathas incensed Alexander to such an extent that Sangala was razed to ground. All this happened near the capital town of Pratisthan (the modern Pathankot). There is no trace of Sangala, however a village Sangram is available near Shahpur Kandi, Tehsil Pathankot. It may be the abbreviated forms of Sangala. The town Kathua on the east bank of Ravi and Kathgarh on western bank of River Beas seems to be inhabited by the Kathas to whom Greeks called Kathoi's. On reaching near Indoura (in District Kangra) - Kathgarh - Mirthal on the Beas, the army of Alexander refused to go further due to weariness and reports of the power of the Nandas of Magadha. When Alexander retreated, Audumbras again came into power and gained their strength. In the days of their prosperity Audumbra kings issued their coins. These early coins are thin pieces of copper either square or oblong. Their identity is marked by the symbols found on these coins such as Trident, Nandi Bull, Swastic and elephant etc. Some silver coins have also been issued by the Audumbra Kings. They were issued in the name of the community and king. These coins bear the name of the king as well as the state as Audumbrisa. Dharaghosa was probably the most famous and great king of the Audumbra republic. These coins remained in use till the fourth century A.D. Sir A. Cunnigham, first Director General of Archeological Survey of India discovered some Audumbra coins from Pathankot itself during the second half of the nineteenth century when he visited this place.

In 1105 A.D. one Jhet Pal Tomar a younger brother of Anangpal Tomar, king of Delhi, travelled to this place and after giving defeat to Kazbak Khan, established his own state called Paithan an abbreviated form of Pratishthan. Jhet Pal built a strong fort at Paithan (modern Pathankot) in the early 12th century which was demolished by the Britishers after the annexation of Punjab State. Another Fort at Shahpur (Kandi) was also built by a Pathania king named Bhakhat Mal in the 15th century.

The capital of Pathania state was shifted from Pathankot to Nurpur then called Dhahmeri in the year 1595 A.D. by Raja Basu. The Pathania regime ruled the state from Pathankot for about five hundred long years and later on from Nurpur up to 1815 A.D. when the state of Nurpur was annexed by Maharaja Ranjit Singh. In 1603, the Pargana Pathankot had been severed from Nurpur and permanently annexed by Emperor Akbar and was handed over to Mirza Rustam Qandhari which remained under Mughal control up to 1759.

On the break up to Mughal empire one Ajaib Rai Puri who was posted as Kanugo at Pathankot has established himself as a king of Pathankot and Sujanpur. Mohalla Purian of Pathankot seems to have been inhabited by this clan. Ajaib Rai Kanugo was supplanted by Sardar Nand Singh Bhangi in 1761 A.D., who died in 1775 without a male child. His widow invited Tara Singh S/o Mutsada Singh of Fatehgarh Churian, Tehsil Batala of Kahnaya Misal to come & marry her daughter and succeed her husband and took the whole of Nand Singh's possession henceforth. Pathankot remained under the control of Kahnaya Misal till 1807 A.D. when Jaimal Singh had to yield his possession to Maharaja Ranjit Singh. The change of name from Paithan to Pathankot took place under the leadership of Sardar Gurbax Singh Kahnaya during the second half of the 19th century. Maharaja Ranjit Singh had 46 wife's. Maharaja married Moran, a Muslim natuch girl of Amritsar in 1802 A.D. with whom the fell in violent love. Moran enjoyed Ranjit Singh's confidence for many years and he had struck gold and silver coins in her name which were called Moran Shahi Sikkey. Suddenly in August 1811 A.D. Moran was sent to Pathankot in a Palkin which was granted to her as Jagir. It is believed that she spent last days of her life at Pathankot.

After the defeat in the first Sikh- Anglo War, Pathankot along with 83 villages were attached with the newly created District of Kangra, by the British and remained as such till the formation of District Gurdaspur which commenced in 1852. In 1853 Pathankot Tehsil was formed with its headquarters at Pathankot. Pathankot got the Tehsil building Pathankot on 17 August 1947. Tricolour of India was hoisted atop of the tehsil building Pathankot on 17 August 1947 after briefly being part of Pakistan for 3 days. Many refugees from Pakistan arrived in Pathankot.

In present times, Pathankot is one of a vibrant places in Punjab with lot of hustle bustle making it one of the famous trade markets and that too a pretty busy one. From Pathankot it's pretty ease to travel up in the hills of Dalhousie and Dharmshala.

The district today

In past, It was a Tehsil of the District Gurdaspur. The present district was formed, as the 22nd district of the state, on 27 July 2011. Pathankot includes the two sub-divisions of Pathankot and Dhar Kalan and the two sub tehsil of Narot Jaimal Singh and Bamial 

Pathankot has gone through a large number of changes and developments as well. It is called the gateway of Himachal Pradesh and J & K states. Ranjit Sagar Dam the Pride of Punjab has been emerged about 30 km. north east of the town Nowadays Mamoon a suburb of Pathankot is heading towards a biggest army cantonment of Asia. Pathankot had already an Air Force Station and shall be coming on the air map of India very shortly. Surprisingly enough, the town is totally devoid of any monumental evidence to speak of its rich past except a high ridge called Shimla Pahari where the historical fort once existed with some part of rouni around the Gulmohar Tourist Complex. A number of various buildings such as PWD Rest House. Gulmohar Tourist Complex, Maharaja Ranjit Singh Municipal Library. Lal Bahadur Shastri Park, Relay center of Doordarshan, and an office of central PWD are located at the site of the Fort.

City and towns
There are two statutory Cities Pathankot and Sujanpur in this district. The district also has 12 census towns, according to census 2011. The list of these cities and towns is shown below.
 Sujanpur ( City Municipal Council)
 Pathankot ( City Municipal Corporation)
 Jugial    (Township)    
 Narot Jaimal Singh (Nagar Panchayat)
 Narot Mehra
 Mamun      (Pathankot Urban)
 Manwal 
 Sarna  (Pathankot Urban)
 Bungal
 Malikpur  (Pathankot Urban)
 Dunera
 Dhar Kalan
 Madhopur
 Ghrota

Other villages and settlements
Abadgarh
Kataruchak
Mirthal, Near Beas river (Last town of Pathankot district)

Demographics
At the time of the 2011 census, the area that would become Pathankot district had a population of 676,598. Out of these 378,432 were rural and 298,166 urban. Pathankot has a sex ratio of 860 females per 1000 males. Scheduled Castes are 207,032 (30.60%) of the population.

At the time of the 2011 census, 89.86% of the population spoke Punjabi, 5.30% Hindi and 1.20% Dogri as their first language. The dialect is in between Kangri and Dogri, the two neighbouring languages.

Politics
Pathankot district is part of the Pathankot Assembly Constituency.

Notable people
 Shaheed Ram Singh Pathania (Rajput Warrior & Freedom Fighter)
 Ashwini Sharma (Ex MLA)
 Seema Kumari (Ex MLA)
 Siddarth Kaul (Cricketer)

References

External links 

 Pathankot tehsil map, Maps of India, retrieved 31 July 2019

 
Districts of Punjab, India
2011 establishments in Punjab, India